The Tarcău Mountains are a mountain range, part of the Moldavian-Muntenian Carpathians of the Outer Eastern Carpathians.

The range is located between the latitudes 46°25′ and 46°57′ N and between the longitudes 25°52′ and 26°28′ E. The range is bordered by the following rivers:

 The Bicaz and the Bistrița to the north.
 The Dămuc and Valea Rece to the west.
 The Trotuș to the south.

To the east they are limited by the subcarpathian hills along a line running approximately from Piatra Neamț to Moinești.

References 
 

Mountain ranges of Romania
Mountain ranges of the Eastern Carpathians